Adrianus Jacobus Zuyderland was  Vincent van Gogh's favorite model during his Hague period. He appears in dozens of drawings, easily identified by his bald head and prominent white whiskers, and he was the model for the drawing which was the basis for van Gogh's later iconic painting At Eternity's Gate.

Background 

He is first mentioned by van Gogh in a letter to Anthon van Rappard, dated around 19 September 1882: "... I’ve also been painting and watercoloring, and in addition I’m drawing many figures from the model as well as scratches [i.e. 'sketches'] on the street. Lately I’ve quite often had a man from the Old Men’s Home to pose.

The "Old Men's Home" was the Nederlands Hervormd Oude-mannen-en-vrouwenhuis in the Om en Bij, The Hague,  and Zuyderland was subsequently identified by W. J. A. Visser in their records from the identification tab 399 on his right arm that can be made out in Orphan Man with Top Hat, and which also appears in a letter sketch (left).

References

Works

Letters

General

Further reading
 de la Faille, Jacob-Baart. The Works of Vincent Van Gogh: His Paintings and Drawings. Amsterdam: Meulenhoff, 1970. 
 Naifeh, Steven; Smith, Gregory White. Van Gogh: The Life. Profile Books, 2011. 
 Pomerans, Arnold. The Letters of Vincent van Gogh. Penguin Classics, 2003. 

1880s paintings
1882 paintings
1883 paintings
Paintings of the Netherlands by Vincent van Gogh
Series of paintings by Vincent van Gogh